Juan Carlos González Leiva is a blind lawyer and human rights activist in Cuba. He created the Fraternity of the Independent Blind of Cuba and the Cuban Foundation of Human Rights.

He has accused the government of harassing and torturing him.

See also 
 Chen Guangcheng, another blind activist, in the communist People's Republic of China.
 Human rights in Cuba
 Cuban dissident movement

References 

Living people
21st-century Cuban lawyers
Cuban human rights activists
Cuban dissidents
Blind activists
Torture in Cuba
Year of birth missing (living people)
Blind lawyers